Cyrtophleba is a genus of flies in the family Tachinidae.

Species
These 10 species belong to the genus Cyrtophleba:
 Cyrtophleba arabica Zeegers, 2007 c g
 Cyrtophleba asiatica Mesnil, 1974 c g
 Cyrtophleba coquilletti Aldrich, 1926 i c g b
 Cyrtophleba eremophila (Richter, 1967) c g
 Cyrtophleba horrida Giglio-Tos, 1893 i c g b
 Cyrtophleba nitida Curran, 1930 i c g b
 Cyrtophleba pollyclari Rocha-e-Silva, de M. D'A. Lopes & Della Lucia, 1999 c g
 Cyrtophleba rhois Townsend, 1916 c g
 Cyrtophleba ruricola (Meigen, 1824) c g
 Cyrtophleba vernalis (Kramer, 1917) c g
Data sources: i = ITIS, c = Catalogue of Life, g = GBIF, b = Bugguide.net

References

Tachinidae genera
Dexiinae
Taxa named by Camillo Rondani
Insects of China